The FIBA Women's AmeriCup (formerly FIBA Americas Championship for Women) is the Americas Women's Basketball Championship that take place every two years between national teams of the continents. The Women's AmeriCup is also a qualifying tournament for the FIBA Women's World Cup and the Olympic Games.

Since FIBA organized the entire Western Hemisphere west of the Atlantic Ocean under one zone, countries from North America, Central America, the Caribbean and South America compete in this tournament.

The U.S. women's basketball team often does not participate in the tournament as it usually qualifies for major tournaments by virtue of winning the World Cup or Olympics.

Summary

Performances by nation

Tournament awards
Most recent award winners (2021)

All-Tournament Team
Most Valuable Player in bold and highlighted in green.

Participating nations

See also
 FIBA AmeriCup (FIBA Americas men's championship)
 FIBA Women's Basketball World Cup

References

External links
Brazil's History for Pre-World Championship Tournaments
Brazil's History for Pre-Olympic Championship Tournaments
FIBA Americas official website
WC Qualifiers medal list

 
Women's basketball competitions in the Americas between national teams
Recurring sporting events established in 1989